Faro is an unincorporated community in Wayne County, North Carolina, United States.

1961 Goldsboro B-52 crash
In Faro— north of Seymour Johnson Air Force Base—two hydrogen bombs dropped during the 1961 Goldsboro B-52 crash as the aircraft broke up in flight.

Notes

Unincorporated communities in Wayne County, North Carolina
Unincorporated communities in North Carolina